Ryan Patrick Torgerson (September 20, 1972 – May 30, 2011) was an American rower. He was born in Cleveland Heights, Ohio and served in the United States Marine Corps. Torgerson died at his home in Wauconda, Illinois at the age of 38.

References

External links 
 

1972 births
2011 deaths
American male rowers
Sportspeople from Cleveland
Military personnel from Cleveland
People from Wauconda, Illinois
World Rowing Championships medalists for the United States